Pkew pkew pkew (stylized as PKEW PKEW PKEW) is a Canadian punk rock band formed in Toronto, Ontario. Pkew pkew pkew's self-titled debut album was released on June 10, 2016 on Royal Mountain Records. On June 21, 2017 Pkew pkew pkew signed with SideOneDummy Records, and re-issued their debut album. They released their sophomore effort in 2019.

History
Pkew pkew pkew released their debut EP on 2013 under Art Drug label

On June 10, 2016. Pkew pkew pkew released their debut album on Royal Mountain Records, later the same month, Pkew pkew pkew performed on tour in North America supporting PUP with Rozwell Kid.

In July 2016, Pkew pkew pkew joined Direct Hit! on their North America tour with Problem Daughter.

In December 2016, Pkew pkew pkew participated at Pup (band) 2016 Homecoming show in Danforth Music Hall, Toronto.

In late January - middle February 2017, Pkew pkew pkew joined Anti-flag and Reel big fish on US tour.

In June 2017, the band signed with SideOneDummy Records and re-issued their debut album with plus one song.

In July 2017, Pkew pkew pkew supported The Flatliners on their East coast tour, alongside Garret Dale.

In September 2018, the band signed to independent UK label Big Scary Monsters and released new track 'Passed Out'.

In March 2019, the band announced another repress for their '+ONE' album. This time it will be released by Belgium's DIY label Bearded Punk Records. It's a limited 500 run on a Cherry Cola 12" vinyl.

In July 2020, it was announced that their song "Mid 20s Skateboarder" is in the new Tony Hawk's Pro Skater 1+2 game.

Discography

Albums
 Pkew Pkew Pkew (2016)
 + ONE [re-issued by SideOneDummy] (2017)
 Pkew Pkew Pkew on Audiotree Live (2017)
 Optimal Lifestyles (2019)
 + ONE [re-issued by Bearded Punk Records] (2019)
 Open Bar (2022)

EP
 Glory Days EP (2013)

Singles 

 Passed Out (2018)
 65 Nickels (2018)
 I Don't Matter at All (2019)
 Maybe Someday (2022)
 Drinking in the Park (2022)

Music videos
 Glory Days (2013)
 Mid 20s Skateboarder/Blood clot (2016)
 Prequel to Asshole Pandemic (2016) 
 Before We Go Out Drinking (2017)
 Katie Lee + Hoda (2017)
 Cold Dead Hands (2017)
 Passed Out (2019)
 65 Nickels (2019)

See also

Music of Canada
Canadian rock

References

External links
 Pkewx3.com Pkew Pkew Pkew Official site
 Pkew Pkew Pkew Pkew pkew pkew Bandcamp page
 Pkew Pkew Pkew All Music page
 Pkew Pkew Pkew Spotify's page

Canadian punk rock groups
Musical groups from Toronto
Musical groups established in 2013
2013 establishments in Ontario